The 2016–17 Oregon State Beavers men's basketball team represented Oregon State University in the 2016–17 NCAA Division I men's basketball season. The Beavers were led by third-year head coach Wayne Tinkle, and played their home games at Gill Coliseum in Corvallis, Oregon as members of the Pac-12 Conference. They finished the season 5–27, 1–17 in Pac-12 play to finish in last place. They lost in the first round of the Pac-12 tournament to California.

Previous season
The Beavers finished the 2015–16 season 19–13, 9–9 in Pac-12 play to finish in a three-way tie for sixth place. They defeated Arizona State in the first round of the Pac-12 tournament before losing to California in the quarterfinals. OSU received an at-large bid to the NCAA tournament as the No. 7 seed in the West Region, marking the Beavers' first NCAA Tournament appearance since 1990. The Beavers lost in the first round of the Tournament to VCU.

Off-season

Departures

Incoming transfers

2016 recruiting class

Roster

Nov. 27 - Sophomore forward Tres Tinkle out since game against Fresno State with a broken right wrist. Would miss the rest of the season.

Schedule and results

|-
!colspan=12 style=| Exhibition

|-
!colspan=12 style=| Non-conference regular season

|-
!colspan=12 style=| Pac-12 regular season

|-
!colspan=12 style=| Pac-12 tournament

References

Oregon State Beavers men's basketball seasons
Oregon State
Oregon State Beavers men's basketball
Oregon State Beavers men's basketball